Zhulin yeshi is a Chinese erotic novel by a writer under the pseudonym Chi Daoren, published between 1610 and 1620. Set in the 7th century BC, it follows a young woman and her sexual escapades.

Plot
Set in around 600 BC during the Spring and Autumn period, a young and unmarried lady named Su'e dreams of being taught the art of love-making by Taoist master Hua Yue. First using her newfound sexual prowess to attain eternal youth, she then seduces multiple men until she is stopped by a rival Taoist master who becomes her lover and joins her in her quest for immortality.

Publication history
Comprising sixteen chapters and twenty-one poems, Zhulin yeshi was written in the late Ming dynasty by an anonymous writer using the pseudonym Chi Daoren, translated into English as "Infatuated Moralist" or "Man of the Crazy Way". The novel was published in Suzhou and likely had its first printing sometime between 1610 and 1620, although it was subsequently banned by the Qing government.

Inspiration
The title of the novel is derived from the song "Zhulin" ("tree forest") collected in the Book of Songs; according to the critic Kong Yingda in Mao Shi zhengyi, the song was written to rebuke Lord Ling of Chen for his illicit sexual relationship with the femme fatale and noblewoman Xia Ji, whose "destructive beauty ... nearly caused the collapse of the state of Chen" and "who was traditionally numbered among the most wicked women of Chinese antiquity." In Zhulin yeshi, the main protagonist is based on Xia Ji, although she is referred to as Su'e, which is in turn an apparent reference to the "extremely rare" illustrated erotic novel titled Su'e pian (published  1610).

Numerous stories concerning "a woman achieving first eternal youth and then transcendency through esoteric sexual practices with multiple partners" predate Zhulin yeshi. For instance, in the Liexian Zhuan, a female protagonist named Nü Wan is guided by a mystery sex master. Likewise, in the Han dynasty text Yufang mijue or Secret Instructions from the Jade Chamber, the Taoist mistress Xiwangmu is described as engaging in "sexual vampirism".

Across the novel, the author adapts sexually explicit scenes from several other sources. For example, a scene in which the protagonist is in Chu, left in a pitiful state with her step-son, is "a cut-and-paste piece taken straight" from Wushan yanshi or Romantic History of Mt. Wu. Zhulin yeshi also presents an "extremely confused" discussion of sex toys; a dildo, for instance, morphs into a Burmese bell without any explanation, which Olivia Milburn suggests may be due to a "garbled interpolation from some unknown source."

Literary significance and reception
Zhulin yeshi is noted for its "rich descriptions of sexual life", both heterosexual and homosexual. Olivia Milburn writes that the female protagonists of the novel "are in striking contrast to those described in other contemporary Ming-dynasty erotic novels". She also praises the author of Zhulin yeshi for their "careful erudition" and meticulous "historical background and characterizations".

Notes

References

Citations

Bibliography

 
 
 
 
 

17th-century Chinese novels
1610s novels
Ming dynasty novels
Chinese erotic novels
Works published under a pseudonym
Novels set in the 7th century BC
Novels set in the Zhou dynasty